The Canton of Molliens-Dreuil  is a former canton situated in the department of the Somme and in the Picardie region of northern France. It was disbanded following the French canton reorganisation which came into effect in March 2015. It had 10,109 inhabitants (2012).

Geography 
The canton is organised around the commune of Molliens-Dreuil in the arrondissement of Amiens. The altitude varies from 11m at Bettencourt-Rivière to 160m at Saint-Aubin-Montenoy for an average of 83m.

The canton comprised 27 communes:

Airaines
Avelesges
Bettencourt-Rivière
Bougainville
Bovelles
Briquemesnil-Floxicourt
Camps-en-Amiénois
Clairy-Saulchoix
Creuse
Fluy
Fresnoy-au-Val
Guignemicourt
Laleu
Métigny
Molliens-Dreuil
Montagne-Fayel
Oissy
Pissy
Quesnoy-sur-Airaines
Quevauvillers
Revelles
Riencourt
Saint-Aubin-Montenoy
Saisseval
Seux
Tailly
Warlus

Population

See also
 Arrondissements of the Somme department
 Cantons of the Somme department
 Communes of the Somme department

References

Molliens-Dreuil
2015 disestablishments in France
States and territories disestablished in 2015